Wanham may refer to:
 Wanham people, a historic ethnic group of Brazil
 Wanham language, an extinct language of Brazil
 Wanham, Alberta, a hamlet in Canada

Language and nationality disambiguation pages